The Legends Classic (currently branded as the Roman Legends Classic) is an annual, early-season, college basketball tournament which started in 2007 and takes place at the beginning of the college basketball season in November. Four teams (from four conferences) compete in the Legends Classic. The tournament has been held at various venues in the New York metropolitan area, primarily the Barclays Center in Brooklyn.

History
The Legends Classic began in 2007 with the first two events being played at the Prudential Center in Newark, NJ. In that first year, only the four regional-round hosts were guaranteed to play four games, as Texas, Tennessee, West Virginia, and New Mexico State each hosted a pair of games, before advancing to the semifinals in Newark. Since the 2008–09 season, each team has been guaranteed to play four games.

In 2013, the field for the event decreased from 12 teams to 8 teams from eight separate conferences, which it continues to be. Two games are held at four different regional sites selected before the tournament. Four teams advance to the semifinals and finals at Barclays Center in New York City, while the remaining four teams play in a tournament format at a predetermined on-campus site.

Yearly champions, runners-up, and MVPs

Most appearances

Brackets 
* – Denotes overtime period

2022 
The 2022 tournament will take place at Barclays Center in Brooklyn The tournament is set to take place from Wednesday, November 16 to Thursday, November 17, 2022.

Championship Round

2021 
The 2021 tournament was set to return to the Barclays Center in Brooklyn but was played at the Prudential Center in Newark. The tournament took place from Monday, November 22 to Tuesday, November 23, 2021. Texas and UCLA were originally set to play, but were replaced by Georgia and Providence.

Championship Round

2020
The field for the tournament for the year 2020 initially included four teams instead of the usual eight due to COVID-19 concerns. BYU replaced Notre Dame after they pulled out of the field. Then later Vanderbilt withdrew from the tournament as well and the format for the competition was changed to a showcase format. The location of the tournament was also relocated to the Mohegan Sun Arena in Uncasville, Connecticut. The participants in the 2020 group included: 
Boston College
BYU
Florida
St. Johns
UConn
USC

Championship Round 
All games in the 2020 Tournament are televised on either ESPN or ESPN2. Due to Notre Dame and Vanderbilt not participating in the tournament, the format was changed to a showcase format with the following results.

MVP: Evan Mobley (USC)

All-Tournament Team: Julian Champagnie (St. John's), Alex Barcello (BYU), James Bouknight (UConn) and Keyontae Johnson (Florida).

2019

 Auburn
 Cal State Northridge
 Colgate
 Green Bay
 McNeese State
 New Mexico
 Richmond
 Wisconsin

Championship Round

2018 participants and bracket
Bowling Green
California
Detroit Mercy
Hampton
Loyola (Md.)
St. John's
Temple
VCU

Championship Round

Sub Regionals

2017 participants and bracket
 Montana
 Oklahoma State
 Oral Roberts
 Penn State
 Pepperdine
 Pittsburgh
 Texas A&M
 UC Santa Barbara

Regionals

Championship Round

Sub Regionals

2016 participants and bracket
Bryant
Colorado
Eastern Washington
Louisiana–Monroe
Northwestern
Notre Dame
Seattle
Texas

2015 participants and bracket
Arizona State
Belmont
IUPUI
Kennesaw State
LSU
Marquette
NC State
South Alabama

2014 participants and bracket
Bucknell
Detroit
Maryland Eastern Shore
Michigan
Oregon
Toledo
Villanova
VCU

2013 participants and bracket
Houston
Howard
Lehigh
Pittsburgh
South Dakota State
Stanford
Texas Southern
Texas Tech

2012 participants and bracket

Duquesne
Georgetown
Georgia
Indiana
James Madison
Liberty
North Dakota State
Sam Houston State
Southern Miss
University of California, Irvine
UCLA
Youngstown State

2011 participants and bracket
Boston University
Bucknell
Cleveland State
Hofstra
Morehead State
North Carolina State
Oregon State
Princeton
Rhode Island
Texas
Vanderbilt
West Alabama

2010 participants and bracket
Albany
Bowling Green
Detroit
Gardner-Webb
Georgia Tech
Michigan
Niagara
Mercer
Syracuse
UTEP
Western Carolina
William & Mary

2009 participants and bracket
Arkansas-Fort Smith
Cornell
Drexel
Michigan State
Georgia Southern
Florida
Rutgers
Toledo
Valparaiso
Vermont
Troy
UMass

2008 participants and bracket
Akron
Eastern Kentucky
East Central (Ok.)
Fairleigh Dickinson
Indiana (Pa.)
Mississippi State
North Alabama
Pittsburgh
Texas Tech
Thiel
Urbana
Washington State

2007 participants and bracket
Arkansas-Monticello
La Verne
LeMoyne–Owen
New Mexico State
Prairie View A&M
Schreiner
University of California, Santa Cruz
Tennessee
Texas
University of California, Davis
West Virginia

See also
Barclays Center Classic

References

External links
 Legends Classic official site
 Basketball Legends

2007 establishments in New Jersey
2007 in sports in New Jersey
21st century in Brooklyn
21st century in East Rutherford, New Jersey
Basketball competitions in New Jersey
College basketball tournaments in Connecticut
College basketball tournaments in New Jersey
College basketball tournaments in New York (state)
College men's basketball competitions in the United States
Sports competitions in Atlantic City, New Jersey
Prospect Heights, Brooklyn
Basketball competitions in Connecticut
Basketball competitions in New York City
Sports competitions in East Rutherford, New Jersey
Sports in Brooklyn
Sports competitions in Uncasville, Connecticut
Recurring sporting events established in 2007